The Domain is a 2019 Portuguese drama film directed by Tiago Guedes. It was selected to compete for the Golden Lion at the 76th Venice International Film Festival. It was also selected as the Portuguese entry for the Best International Feature Film at the 92nd Academy Awards, but it was not nominated.

Plot
The Fernandes are a family of landowners who have passed down a vast estate on the southern bank of the Tagus River in Portugal for generations. In 1973 João, the undisputed patriarch and current owner of the estate, will have to deal with the events linked to the Carnation Revolution and, twenty years later, with the anxieties and the legacy of the next generation.

Cast
  as João Fernandes
 Sandra Faleiro as Leonor
  as Joaquim Correia
 João Vicente as Leonel Sousa
 João Pedro Mamede as Miguel
 Ana Vilela da Costa as Rosa
 Rodrigo Tomás as António
 Beatriz Brás as Teresa

Release

On September 5, 2019, the film was shown as part of the Official Selection at the Venice International Film Festival where it received a standing ovation after its first showing. The film was then released in Portugal on September 19, 2019.

Awards
The homestead won the Golden Globe for Best Film this Sunday night, at the 25th Golden Globes Gala, taking place at the Coliseu dos Recreios, an award given by Jorge Corrula e Soraia Chaves.

See also
 List of submissions to the 92nd Academy Awards for Best International Feature Film
 List of Portuguese submissions for the Academy Award for Best International Feature Film

References

External links
 

2019 films
2019 drama films
Portuguese drama films
2010s Portuguese-language films
Sophia Award winners
Golden Globes (Portugal) winners